Samuel Blair (June 14, 1712 – July 5, 1751) was a Presbyterian minister and one of the leaders of the Presbyterian New Light religious movement that swept the North American colonies as part of the First Great Awakening.  In 1739, he founded a theology school, Faggs Manor Classical School, near his church in Faggs Manor, Pennsylvania. Blair's son, also named Samuel Blair was born in Faggs Manor, and became the second Chaplain of the United States House of Representatives. The church was rebuilt in 1846 and is now known simply as the Faggs Manor Presbyterian Church.

Life
Blair was born in Ulster, Ireland on June 14, 1712 to William Blair. He immigrated to the colonies in his youth. He was educated in 1730–1735 under Reverend William Tennent at the Log College, the first theological seminary serving Presbyterians in North America located in what is now Warminster, Pennsylvania (then known as Neshaminy). He was licensed to preach by the Presbytery of Philadelphia on November 9, 1733 and ordained in September 1737. In the spring of 1734, he was asked to preach in the New Jersey towns of Millstone, Cranberry, Middletown, and Shrewsbury. He accepted the position in Middletown and Shrewsbury in September of that year. While in New Jersey, he was an original member of the Presbytery of New Brunswick.  In June 1735, Blair married Frances van Hook, daughter of Judge Lawrence van Hook and Johanna (Smith) van Hook, who was the daughter of Hendrick Barents Smith of New York City.

In 1739, he was called to Fagg's Manor, Pennsylvania but deferred to the Presbytery which advised him to accept. He returned to Pennsylvania 1739 and founded the Faggs Manor Presbyterian church and associated classical school in Londonderry Township. Many prominent Presbyterian clergy were trained there, including Samuel Davies who became the fourth President of the College of New Jersey (now Princeton University).

It was during this time that Blair participated in the "New Side" of the division of the Presbyterian Church in Pennsylvania during the Great Awakening, embracing the revivals.. Blair's sermons, such as "A Perswasive to Repentance" are full of dense expressive figures, balanced argumentation  and  dialogic  interludes. In his revival preaching, Blair aims  at  evoking  negative  emotions towards sinful laxness and presenting the Great Awakening as a breakthrough in the history of colonial America.

Blair became ill while traveling to meet with the trustees of the College of New Jersey. He died in Faggs Manor on July 5, 1751 and is buried in the church cemetery.

Legacy
In 1754, his principal writings (seven important sermons), an elegy by Samuel Davies, and eulogy by Reverend Samuel Finley (fifth President of the College of New Jersey) were published in Philadelphia by his brother, John Blair who took over at the Faggs Manor church.

References

1712 births
1751 deaths
American Presbyterian ministers
Log College alumni
People from Ulster
Irish emigrants to the United States (before 1923)
18th-century American clergy